Johannes "Hannes" Linßen (born 28 September 1949) is a German former football player, coach and manager.

Playing career
Linßen began his career with Bundesliga club MSV Duisburg in 1968 before dropping a division in 1974 to join SC Fortuna Köln, where he remained until the end of his career in 1984. He played in the 1983 final of the DFB cup, which his team lost 1–0 to local rivals 1. FC Köln.

On 23 January 1971, while playing for MSV Duisburg against Rot-Weiß Oberhausen, Linßen received the first ever yellow card to be awarded in the Bundesliga, although the card should in fact have been awarded to his teammate Đorđe Pavlić, the referee having confused the two players.

Managerial career
Following his retirement as a player, Linßen was appointed manager of SC Fortuna Köln in 1984. He remained in charge until a bad start to the 1986–87 season led to his departure. He had a second stint as manager of the club from April 1987 to August 1989. Linßen was assistant manager of 1. FC Köln from July 1990 until February 1993, after which he had a third spell as manager of SC Fortuna Köln. His final managerial position was with FC Gütersloh from 1996 to 1998.

Linßen returned to 1. FC Köln as director of football in 1998. During his three-and-a-half years in this position, the club achieved promotion to the Bundesliga in 2000. But by 2002 the club were heading towards relegation and, amid much personal criticism, particularly for the eight-year contract given to 12-year-old Marco Quotschalla, Linßen resigned on 11 February.

References

1949 births
Living people
Association football midfielders
German footballers
Bundesliga players
2. Bundesliga players
MSV Duisburg players
SC Fortuna Köln players
German football managers
2. Bundesliga managers
1. FC Köln managers
SC Fortuna Köln managers
FC Gütersloh 2000 managers
Sportspeople from Düsseldorf (region)
Footballers from North Rhine-Westphalia